Pam is a nearly extinct, unclassified Mbum language of northern Cameroon. There are only about 30 speakers remaining in the vicinity of Tcholliré (Tcholliré commune, Mayo-Rey department, Northern Region).

References

Languages of Cameroon
Mbum languages